is the second anime television series adaptation of the Moomin book series by the Finnish illustrator and writer Tove Jansson.  It is a remake of the 1969-1970 Moomin series, which was loosely based on the books.
It was produced in 1972 by Zuiyo Eizo and Mushi Production as part of the Calpis Comic Theater (later known as World Masterpiece Theater) and broadcast on Fuji TV.

Production
The series was produced as a remake after the 1969-70 series was cancelled after Jansson's complaints about its radical difference from how she wanted the series to be. Neither the series nor its 1969 predecessor broadcast outside Japan except Taiwan, which aired in TTV.  Unlike its predecessor, the series was more faithful to the books. It was initially simply broadcast as Moomin and subsequently retitled Shin Moomin to distinguish it from the 1969 series.

Episodes

See also
 Moomin (1969 TV series)
 Moomin (1990 TV series)

References

External links

1972 anime television series debuts
Fantasy anime and manga
Fuji TV original programming
Moomin television series
Mushi Production
Television shows based on children's books
World Masterpiece Theater series
ja:ムーミン (アニメ)#ムーミン（1972年版）